This is a list of films which placed number one at the weekend box office for the year 2011 in the Philippines.

*Local Film

References

 

Philippines
2011
Numb